Pheletes is a genus of click beetle belonging to the family Elateridae.

Species
 Pheletes aeneoniger (DeGeer, 1774)
 Pheletes lecontei (Lane, 1971)

References

Elateridae genera
Dendrometrinae